The Melodi Grand Prix Junior 2006 is Norway's fifth national Melodi Grand Prix Junior for singers ages 8 to 15 years old. It was held on April 21, 2006, in Oslo Spektrum, Oslo, Norway.  It was broadcast live for a total of 1 hour and 15 minutes.  The hosts were Stian Barsnes Simonsen and Nadia Hasnaoui. A total of 10 children participated. The contest was won by 10-year-old Ole Runar Gillebo with his song Fotball e supert (Football is super). Ole won the public vote by a landslide and received the trophy from Malin Reitan, who won the 2005 contest.

As the winners of Norway's national competition, Ole, Sondre, and Drops went on to compete in MGP Nordic 2006, with participants from Norway, Sweden, and Denmark.

The album Melodi Grand Prix Junior 2006 containing the songs of the finals reached No. 3 on the VG-lista Norwegian Albums Chart on week 18 of 2006.

Results

First round

Super Final

Interval acts
The halftime acts included Mira Craig performing "Who Make You" and Malin Reitan performing "Sommer og skolefri".

See also
 Melodi Grand Prix Junior 2005
 Melodi Grand Prix Junior 2007

External links
Official Website
The Melodi Grand Prix Junior 2006 show Part 1 | Part 2

Melodi Grand Prix Junior
Music festivals in Norway

sv:Melodi Grand Prix Junior 2006